Rogaland is one of the 19 multi-member constituencies of the Storting, the national legislature of Norway. The constituency was established in 1921 following the introduction of proportional representation for elections to the Storting. It is conterminous with the county of Rogaland. The constituency currently elects 13 of the 169 members of the Storting using the open party-list proportional representation electoral system. At the 2021 parliamentary election it had 333,475 registered electors.

Electoral system
Rogaland currently elects 13 of the 169 members of the Storting using the open party-list proportional representation electoral system. Constituency seats are allocated by the County Electoral Committee using the Modified Sainte-Laguë method. Compensatory seats (seats at large) are calculated based on the national vote and are allocated by the National Electoral Committee using the Modified Sainte-Laguë method at the constituency level (one for each constituency). Only parties that reach the 4% national threshold compete for compensatory seats.

Election results

Summary

(Excludes compensatory seats. Figures in italics represent joint lists.)

Detailed

2020s

2021
Results of the 2021 parliamentary election held on 13 September 2021:

The following candidates were elected:
Olaug Bollestad (KrF); Tina Bru (H); Ingrid Fiskaa (SV); Margret Hagerup (H); Terje Halleland (FrP); Lisa Marie Ness Klungland (Sp); Mímir Kristjánsson (R); Tove Elise Madland (Ap); Geir Pollestad (Sp); Torstein Tvedt Solberg (Ap); Roy Steffensen (FrP); Sveinung Stensland (H); Aleksander Stokkebø (H); and Hadia Tajik (Ap).

2010s

2017
Results of the 2017 parliamentary election held on 11 September 2017:

The following candidates were elected:
Olaug Bollestad (KrF); Tina Bru (H); Margret Hagerup (H); Terje Halleland (FrP); Øystein Langholm Hansen (Ap); Bent Høie (H); Solveig Horne (FrP); Solfrid Lerbrekk (SV); Hege Haukeland Liadal (Ap); Geir Pollestad (Sp); Torstein Tvedt Solberg (Ap); Roy Steffensen (FrP); Sveinung Stensland (H); and Hadia Tajik (Ap).

2013
Results of the 2013 parliamentary election held on 8 and 9 September 2013:

The following candidates were elected:
Olaug Bollestad (KrF); Tina Bru (H); Bent Høie (H); Solveig Horne (FrP); Arve Kambe (H); Hege Haukeland Liadal (Ap); Siri A. Meling (H); Iselin Nybø (V); Geir Pollestad (Sp); Torstein Tvedt Solberg (Ap); Roy Steffensen (FrP); Eirin Kristin Sund (Ap); Bente Thorsen (FrP); and Geir Toskedal (KrF).

2000s

2009
Results of the 2009 parliamentary election held on 13 and 14 September 2009:

The following candidates were elected:
Bent Høie (H); Solveig Horne (FrP); Dagfinn Høybråten (KrF); Arve Kambe (H);Magnhild Meltveit Kleppa (Sp); Hallgeir H. Langeland (SV); Siri A. Meling (H); Tore Nordtun (Ap); Torfinn Opheim (Ap); Ketil Solvik-Olsen (FrP); Eirin Kristin Sund (Ap); Bente Thorsen (FrP); and Øyvind Vaksdal (FrP).

2005
Results of the 2005 parliamentary election held on 11 and 12 September 2005:

The following candidates were elected:
Bent Høie (H); Solveig Horne (FrP); Dagfinn Høybråten (KrF); Magnhild Meltveit Kleppa (Sp); Gunnar Kvassheim (V); Hallgeir H. Langeland (SV); Tore Nordtun (Ap); Torfinn Opheim (Ap); Ketil Solvik-Olsen (FrP); Eirin Kristin Sund (Ap); Bjørg Tørresdal (KrF); Øyvind Vaksdal (FrP); and Finn Martin Vallersnes (H).

2001
Results of the 2001 parliamentary election held on 9 and 10 September 2001:

The following candidates were elected:
Bent Høie (H); Magnhild Meltveit Kleppa (Sp); Hallgeir H. Langeland (SV); Siri A. Meling (H); Tore Nordtun (Ap); Jan Simonsen (FrP); Oddbjørg Ausdal Starrfelt (Ap); Einar Steensnæs (KrF); Bjørg Tørresdal (KrF); Øyvind Vaksdal (FrP); and Finn Martin Vallersnes (H).

1990s

1997
Results of the 1997 parliamentary election held on 15 September 1997:

The following candidates were elected:
Jan Johnsen (H); Hilde Frafjord Johnson (KrF); Magnhild Meltveit Kleppa (Sp); Gunnar Kvassheim (V); Hallgeir H. Langeland (SV); Tore Nordtun (Ap); Jan Petter Rasmussen (Ap); Jan Simonsen (FrP); Oddbjørg Ausdal Starrfelt (Ap); Einar Steensnæs (KrF); Inger Stolt-Nielsen (H); and Øyvind Vaksdal (FrP).

1993
Results of the 1993 parliamentary election held on 12 and 13 September 1993:

The following candidates were elected:
Unn Aarrestad (Sp); Gunnar Fatland (H); Hilde Frafjord Johnson (KrF); Magnhild Meltveit Kleppa (Sp); Eilef A. Meland (SV); Tore Nordtun (Ap); Magnar Sætre (Ap); Jan Simonsen (FrP); Oddbjørg Ausdal Starrfelt (Ap); Einar Steensnæs (KrF); and Thorhild Widvey (H).

1980s

1989
Results of the 1989 parliamentary election held on 10 and 11 September 1989:

The following candidates were elected:
Gunnar Berge (Ap); Petter Bjørheim (FrP); Gunnar Fatland (H); Sverre Mauritzen (H); Eilef A. Meland (SV); Gunn Vigdis Olsen-Hagen (Ap); Borghild Røyseland (KrF); Magnar Sætre (Ap); Jan Simonsen (FrP); John S. Tveit (KrF); Ole Gabriel Ueland (Sp); and Thorhild Widvey (H).

1985
Results of the 1985 parliamentary election held on 8 and 9 September 1985:

The following candidates were elected:
Gunnar Berge (Ap); Gunnar Fatland (H); Hans Frette (Ap); Marit Løvvig (H); Sverre Mauritzen (H); Gunn Vigdis Olsen-Hagen (Ap); Borghild Røyseland (KrF); Lars Storhaug (H); John S. Tveit (KrF); and Ole Gabriel Ueland (Sp).

1981
Results of the 1981 parliamentary election held on 13 and 14 September 1981:

The following candidates were elected:
Jakob Aano (KrF); Gunnar Berge (Ap); Claus Egil Feyling (H); Hans Frette (Ap); Knut Haus (KrF); Marit Løvvig (H); Sverre Mauritzen (H); Jens Marcussen (FrP); Gunn Vigdis Olsen-Hagen (Ap); and Ole Gabriel Ueland (Sp).

1970s

1977
Results of the 1977 parliamentary election held on 11 and 12 September 1977:

The following candidates were elected:
Jakob Aano (KrF); Gunnar Berge (Ap); Claus Egil Feyling (H); Hans Frette (Ap); Knut Haus (KrF); Geirmund Ihle (Ap); Kristin Kverneland Lønningdal (H); Marit Løvvig (H); Gunn Vigdis Olsen-Hagen (Ap); and Ole Gabriel Ueland (Sp).

1973
Results of the 1973 parliamentary election held on 9 and 10 September 1973:

The following candidates were elected:
Jakob Aano (KrF); Karl Aasland (Sp); Gunnar Berge (Ap); Edvard Magnus Edvardsen (Ap); Erling Erland (ALP); Berge Furre (SV); Knut Haus (KrF); Geirmund Ihle (Ap); Kristin Kverneland Lønningdal (H); and Lauritz Bernhard Sirevaag (H).

1960s

1969
Results of the 1969 parliamentary election held on 7 and 8 September 1969:

The following candidates were elected:
Jakob Aano (KrF); Karl Aasland (Sp); Gunnar Berge (Ap); Karl J. Brommeland (KrF); Edvard Magnus Edvardsen (Ap); Egil Endresen (H); Ingvar Lars Helle (V); Geirmund Ihle (Ap); Peder P. Næsheim (Ap); and Lauritz Bernhard Sirevaag (H).

1965
Results of the 1965 parliamentary election held on 12 and 13 September 1965:

The following candidates were elected:
Jakob Aano (KrF); Karl J. Brommeland (KrF); Edvard Magnus Edvardsen (Ap); Egil Endresen (H); Ingolv Helland (V); Gunnar Fredrik Hellesen (H); Sunniva Hakestad Møller (Ap); Peder P. Næsheim (Ap); Inga Lovise Tusvik (V); and Bjarne Undheim (Sp).

1961
Results of the 1961 parliamentary election held on 11 September 1961:

The following candidates were elected:
Ole Bergesen (H), 20,538 votes; Kjell Bondevik (KrF), 18,842 votes; Karl J. Brommeland (KrF), 18,840 votes; Trond Hegna (Ap), 41,991 votes;  Ingolv Helland (V), 20,130 votes; Gunnar Fredrik Hellesen (H), 20,555 votes; Sunniva Hakestad Møller (Ap), 41,983 votes; Lars Ramndal (V), 20,127 votes; Jakob Martinus Remseth (Ap), 41,992 votes; and Bjarne Undheim (Sp), 12,913 votes.

1950s

1957
Results of the 1957 parliamentary election held on 7 October 1957:

The following candidates were elected:
Ole Bergesen (H); Kjell Bondevik (KrF); Karl J. Brommeland (KrF); Trond Hegna (Ap); Paul Ingebretsen (V); Peter Torleivson Molaug (H); Sunniva Hakestad Møller (Ap); Lars Ramndal (V); Jakob Martinus Remseth (Ap); and Lars Elisæus Vatnaland (Bp).

1953
Results of the 1953 parliamentary election held on 12 October 1953:

The following candidates were elected:
Ole Bergesen (H); Kjell Bondevik (KrF); Trond Hegna (Ap); Ivar Kristiansen Hognestad (Ap); Paul Ingebretsen (V); Peter Torleivson Molaug (H); Lars Ramndal (V); Jakob Martinus Remseth (Ap); Lars Elisæus Vatnaland (Bp); and Endre Kristian Vestvik (KrF).

1940s

1949
Results of the 1949 parliamentary election held on 10 October 1949:

The following candidates were elected:
Kjell Bondevik (KrF); Ivar Kristiansen Hognestad (Ap); Lars Ramndal (V); Jakob Martinus Remseth (Ap); and Lars Elisæus Vatnaland (H-Bp).

1945
Results of the 1945 parliamentary election held on 8 October 1945:

As the list alliance was entitled to more seats contesting as an alliance than it was contesting as individual parties, the distribution of seats was as list alliance votes. The H-Bp list alliance's additional seat was allocated to the Conservative Party.

The following candidates were elected:
Ivar Kristiansen Hognestad (Ap); Lars Ramndal (V); Jakob Martinus Remseth (Ap); Lars Elisæus Vatnaland (Bp); and Torkell Vinje (H).

1930s

1936
Results of the 1936 parliamentary election held on 19 October 1936:

As the list alliance was not entitled to more seats contesting as an alliance than it was contesting as individual parties, the distribution of seats was as party votes.

The following candidates were elected:
Kristian Edland (V); Ivar Kristiansen Hognestad (Ap); Karl K. Kleppe (V); Nils Martinsen Kverneland (Bp); and Torkell Vinje (H).

1933
Results of the 1933 parliamentary election held on 16 October 1933:

As the list alliance was not entitled to more seats contesting as an alliance than it was contesting as individual parties, the distribution of seats was as party votes.

The following candidates were elected:
Kristian Edland (V); Ivar Kristiansen Hognestad (Ap); Karl K. Kleppe (V); Nils Martinsen Kverneland (Bp); and Torkell Vinje (H).

1930
Results of the 1930 parliamentary election held on 20 October 1930:

The following candidates were elected:
Hans Aarstad (V); Karl K. Kleppe (V); Nils Martinsen Kverneland (Bp); Otto Georg Jahn Reimers (Bp); and Torkell Vinje (H-FV).

1920s

1927
Results of the 1927 parliamentary election held on 17 October 1927:

The following candidates were elected:
Hans Aarstad (V); Emil Aase (Ap); Karl K. Kleppe (V); Nils Martinsen Kverneland (Bp); and Otto Georg Jahn Reimers (Bp).

1924
Results of the 1924 parliamentary election held on 21 October 1924:

The following candidates were elected:
Hans Aarstad (V); Jacob Kristensen Austbø (V); Jakob Svendsen Gimre (H-FV); Karl K. Kleppe (V); and Nils Martinsen Kverneland (Bp).

1921
Results of the 1921 parliamentary election held on 24 October 1921:

The following candidates were elected:
Hans Aarstad (V); Torjus Larsen Gard (V); Jakob Svendsen Gimre (H-M); Karl K. Kleppe (V); and Otto Georg Jahn Reimers (L).

Notes

References

Storting constituency
Storting constituencies
Storting constituencies established in 1921